Macropanax dispermus is a species of plant in the family Araliaceae.

References

dispermus
Flora of tropical Asia